Ronny & Julia is a book series by Måns Gahrton & Johan Unenge. A Swedish TV series version became the 2000 SVT Christmas calendar.

Books
Ronny & Julia : en historia om en som vill bli omtyckt - 1995
Ronny & Julia längtar - 1996 (rerelased 2004)
Ronny & Julia och tjejbacillerna - 1997
Ronny & Julia sover över - 1998
Ronny & Julia får en hund - 1999
Ronny & Julia tror på tomten - 2000
Ronny & Julia bästa kompisar - 2001
Ronny & Julia rymmer - 2002
Ronny & Julia börjar skolan - 2003
Ronny & Julia och en miljon monster - 2005
Ronny & Julia börjar skolan - 2005
Ronny & Julia börjar skolan - 2006
Ronny & Julia: läskigt och roligt - 2007

References

Swedish children's literature
Series of children's books